The 2003 British Open Championships was held at the Albert Hall, Nottingham from 28 September - 5 October 2003.David Palmer won the title defeating Peter Nicol in the final. There was a reduced field for the main draw with just four qualifying places available.

Seeds

Draw and results

First qualifying round

Second qualifying round

Final qualifying round

Main draw

References

Men's British Open Squash Championships
Squash in England
Men's British Open
Men's British Open Squash Championship
2000s in Nottingham
Sport in Nottingham
Men's British Open Squash Championship
Men's British Open Squash Championship